Inger may refer to:

People
 Inger (given name), a list of people
 Inger, the main character of Hans Christian Andersen's fairy tale The Girl Who Trod on a Loaf
 Robert F. Inger (1920–2019), American herpetologist
 Stella Inger, American television journalist

Other uses
 Inger, Minnesota, United States, an unincorporated community and census-designated place
 Izhora River, also known as the Inger River, a tributary of the Neva River in Russia
 SS Inger (1930), a cargo ship torpedoed and sunk by a German U-boat in World War II; see List of shipwrecks in August 1941 (23 August)